The 1975 Florida Gators football team represented the University of Florida during the 1975 NCAA Division I football season. The season was Doug Dickey's sixth and most successful season as the head coach of the Florida Gators football team.  Dickey's 1975 Florida Gators finished with a 9–3 overall record and a 5–1 Southeastern Conference (SEC) record, tying for second among ten SEC teams. The team featured consensus All-American linebacker Sammy Green.

Schedule

Primary source: 2015 Florida Gators Football Media Guide

Attendance figures: 1976 University of Florida Press Guide.

Roster

Team players in the NFL

References

Florida
Florida Gators football seasons
Florida Gators football